In mathematics, reduced homology is a minor modification made to homology theory in algebraic topology, motivated by the intuition that all of the homology groups of a single point should be equal to zero. This modification allows more concise statements to be made (as in Alexander duality) and eliminates many exceptional cases (as in the homology groups of spheres).

If P is a single-point space, then with the usual definitions the integral homology group

H0(P) 

Hi(P) = {0}.

More generally if X is a simplicial complex or finite CW complex, then the group  H0(X) is the free abelian group with the connected components of X as generators. The reduced homology should replace this group, of rank r say, by one of rank r − 1. Otherwise the homology groups should remain unchanged. An ad hoc way to do this is to think of a 0-th homology class not as a formal sum of connected components, but as such a formal sum where the coefficients add up to zero. 

In the usual definition of homology of a space X, we consider the chain complex

To define reduced homology, we start with the augmented chain complex

where . Now we define the reduced homology groups by 

One can show that ; evidently  for all positive n.

Armed with this modified complex, the standard ways to obtain homology with coefficients by applying the tensor product, or reduced cohomology groups from the cochain complex made by using a Hom functor, can be applied.

References
 Hatcher, A., (2002) Algebraic Topology  Cambridge University Press, . Detailed discussion of homology theories for simplicial complexes and manifolds, singular homology, etc.

Homology theory

de:Singuläre_Homologie#Reduzierte_Homologie